Sybra mikurensis is a species of beetle in the family Cerambycidae. It was described by Hayashi in 1969.

References

mikurensis
Beetles described in 1969